The 2019–20 Ukrainian Basketball SuperLeague was the 2019–20 edition of the Ukrainian top-tier basketball championship. Khimik were the defending champions.

This season will mark the debut season of Prometey Kamianske and Kharkivski Sokoly.

On 13 March 2020, the season was ended prematurely due to the coronavirus pandemic, with Dnipro named champions and Kyiv-Basket as runner-up.

Teams 

On 13 August 2019, the Basketball Federation of Ukraine (FBU) announced that nine teams will participate in this SuperLeague season, including two newcomers. Prometey Kamianske was promoted as champions of the Ukrainian Higher League. Kharkivski Sokoly entered the league as replacement for BC Politekhnik, which could not give the financial guarantees needed and left the league after three seasons.

Squads

BC Dnipro

Kharkivski Sokoly

SC Prometey

BC Khimik

Kyiv-Basket

MBC Mykolaiv

BC Zaporizhya

Regular season

Standings

Results

Ukrainian clubs in European competitions

References

External links
Official Ukrainian Basketball Federation website

Ukrainian Basketball SuperLeague seasons
1
Ukraine
Ukrainian Basketball SuperLeague